Kristyles is the sixth solo studio album by American rapper and record producer KRS-One. It was released on June 24, 2003 through Koch Records. Production was handled by DJ Tiné Tim, Da Beatminerz, Choco, DJ Revolution, Gato, Inebriated Beats, Kenny Parker, the Ghetto Professionals, and KRS-One himself. It features guest appearances from Peedo and Tekitha. The album peaked at number 186 on the Billboard 200, number 30 on the Top R&B/Hip-Hop Albums, and number 10 on the Independent Albums in the United States. It spawned two singles: "Underground" and "How Bad Do You Want It". The latter appeared on 2004 album KRS-ONE Presents Peedo & The Luna Empire.

According to KRS-One, the record was released without his consent by Koch. The title that KRS-One wanted for the record was The Kristyle, an acronym for the phrase "To have everything, keep radiating in spirit through your love everyday."

Track listing

Note
The song "Ya Feel Dat" did not appear on some versions of the album.

Personnel
Lawrence "KRS-One" Parker – main artist, producer (tracks: 10, 13)
Peedo – featured artist (track 5)
Tekitha Washington – featured artist (track 10)
DJ Tiné Tim – producer (tracks: 2, 3, 8, 14)
Walter "Mr. Walt" Dewgarde – producer (tracks: 4, 9, 12)
Ewart "DJ Evil Dee" Dewgarde – producer (track 4)
Gato Luna – producer (track 5)
Mike "Heron" Herald – producer (tracks: 6, 7)
Victor "V.I.C." Padilla – producer (tracks: 6, 7)
Choco – producer (tracks: 10, 13), mixing (tracks: 1-11, 13-15, 17)
Kurt "DJ Revolution" Hoffman – producer (tracks: 11, 15), mixing (tracks: 12, 16)
DJ Kenny Parker – producer (track 16)
Inebriated Beats – producer (track 17)
Cliff Cultreri – mastering
Simone Parker – executive producer
Jeff Gilligan – design

Charts

References

External links

2003 albums
KRS-One albums
E1 Music albums
Albums produced by KRS-One
Albums produced by Da Beatminerz